Bolero (French: Boléro) is a 1942 French comedy film directed by Jean Boyer and starring Arletty, André Luguet and Jacques Dumesnil. It takes its name from the Bolero, a Latin American dance and the composer Maurice Ravel's piece of music inspired by the style of it.

The film's sets were designed by the art director Lucien Aguettand. It was made by Pathé at the company's Francoeur Studios. Future star Simone Signoret had a small, uncredited role in the film.

Cast
 Arletty as Catherine  
 André Luguet as Rémi  
 Jacques Dumesnil as Georges  
 Meg Lemonnier as Miquette  
 Christian Gérard as Paul Bardot  
 André Bervil as Laurent  
 Louis Salou as Professeur Archaimbaud 
 Paul Ollivier as Le deuxième témoin  
 Jacques Roussel as Horace  
 Guita Karen as La bonne  
 Denise Grey as Anne-Marie 
 Lucienne Legrand
 Nathalie Alexeeff 
 Janine Berry
 Marguerite de Morlaye as Dame à la présentation de la collection  
 Robert Le Fort as Un comédien de théâtre 
 Frédéric Mariotti as Le comédien  
 Simone Signoret as Une employée de la maison de couture (uncredited)

References

Bibliography 
 Hayward, Susan. Simone Signoret: The Star as Cultural Sign. A&C Black, 2004.

External links 
 

1942 films
French comedy films
1942 comedy films
1940s French-language films
Films directed by Jean Boyer
Pathé films
French black-and-white films
Films shot at Francoeur Studios
1940s French films